Edwin B. Tilton (September 15, 1859 – January 16, 1926) was an American actor of the silent era. He appeared in more than 60 films between 1912 and 1925. He was born in Chicago, Illinois and died in Hollywood, California.

Selected filmography

 Cupid's Round Up (1918)
 Under the Yoke (1918)
 Riddle Gawne (1918)
 The Shuttle (1918)
 A Midnight Romance (1919)
 The Lincoln Highwayman (1919)
 Her Kingdom of Dreams (1919)
 Faith (1920)
 Just Pals (1920)
 Curtain (1920)
 The Iron Heart (1920)
 Two Moons (1920)
 Love's Harvest (1920)
 The Mother Heart (1921)
 What Love Will Do (1921)
 Bucking the Line (1921)
 Bare Knuckles (1921)
 Lovetime (1921)
 The Lamplighter (1921)
 Man Under Cover (1922)
The Cub Reporter (1922)
 Thundergate (1923)
 The Midnight Express (1924)
 The Lone Chance (1924)
 Why Get Married? (1924)
 Racing for Life (1924)
 The House of Youth (1924)
 The Taming of the West (1925)

External links

1859 births
1926 deaths
American male film actors
American male silent film actors
Male actors from Chicago
20th-century American male actors